DRUM Agency was an independently owned marketing agency with operations in Atlanta,  New York City and Chicago. It shut down without notice on April 15, 2020. It was the result of the merger of BKV (Bennett Kuhn Varner), unified.agency, Hiccup and Umarketing firms. The oldest agency, BKV, originally specialized in direct response marketing, then later expanded into traditional media, followed by digital media. Clients included both for-profit businesses and nonprofit organizations.

History

BKV 

BKV was founded as Bennet Kuhn Varner in 1981 with Six Flags Theme Parks as one of the first clients.

In 1996, BKV created and produced a two-minute DRTV commercial for Dirt Devil to introduce the Broom Vac three months before a retail launch. This direct response television campaign sold a total of 100,000 units during the period. The ad was launched after the Christmas season and helped lead into the Mother's Day gift-buying season.

Early and mid-March 2001, BKV launched a series of direct response television commercials for Marietta's Matria Healthcare Inc. for their diabetes self-care division. The DRTV commercials target audience was seniors age 65 and over. They were to call a toll-free number to order diabetes-care supplies through the mail instead of through pharmacies.

June 2001, Direct Results Network was created as a sister company of BKV. In 2002, the name was changed to Response Mine Interactive (RMI).

In 2002, Ad Age named BKV one of the top agencies by U.S. direct marketing revenue at #49.

On Sept 2, 2005, BKV employees collected money on the streets of Buckhead for victims of Hurricane Katrina. Agency owners Brent Kuhn and Maribett Varner matched the donation raised and BKV sent $3,218 to the American Red Cross.

In 2006, BKV began using marketing techniques to better reach clients and consumers by using video and audio Podcasts and mobile platforms.

In 2007, Equifax chose BKV to handle its $11 million account for direct response, search engine optimization and marketing services. To expand communication programs beyond the internet, Equifax chose to utilize print, direct mail and direct response television.

BKV merged with Weyforth-Haas Marketing of Overland Park, Kansas in 2007. The joined company took on the name BKV Inc. in 2008.

BKV and sister company RMI moved to 8th, 9th and 10th floors of Lenox Towers at 3390 Peachtree Road, Atlanta, Georgia, 30326 in June 2009 with the help of CresaPartners. BKV was previously located at 2964 Peachtree Road for ten years.

In 2013, Dave Mundo, Analytics Director at BKV, spoke at Digital Summit Atlanta on media and marketing content alongside entrepreneurs and digital strategists.

In 2014, Jana Ferguson, EVP and Director of Client Services, spoke at Digital Summit Atlanta about the importance of being results driven and analytical within paid search marketing, display advertising, email acquisition and web development.

Greg Lee, Director of SEO at BKV, spoke at SES Atlanta in 2015 on brand visibility and search engine optimization. SES Atlanta is a conference that focuses on various types of search marketing from paid search to organic search.

In 2015, Todd Chambers, Group Creative Director VP at BKV, discussed the strategies and trends of web design and user experience at SEMPO Google+ Hangout. Expert guest speakers discussed these topics in an open question and answer format.

In October 2015, BKV provided nonprofit marketing services to support 48in48 as both a sponsor and source of volunteers including web designers, developers and copywriters. This event, which took place at General Assembly in Ponce City Market, provided 48 custom WordPress websites for 48 Atlanta-based nonprofits in no more than 48 hours.

DRUM Agency 
In 2016 BKV began collaborating with three other agencies, Hiccup, Umarketing and unified.agency as a planned two-year consolidation. Then in 2018, these agencies merged into one marketing firm under the name DRUM Agency, led by CEO George Wiedemann and COO Ken Lomasney with operations in Atlanta, Chicago and New York. In April 2020, DRUM Agency shut its Atlanta office down suddenly and without explanation.

Services
Offerings under BKV included digital advertising, search engine marketing, advanced data and analytics, direct mail, customer relationship management, email marketing, broadcast creative and media services, search engine optimization, social media marketing and digital PR. The company also provided web and mobile development services, such as design, static site generation, API integration, and database administration. With the merger to DRUM Agency, additional creative, technology and analytics services were added to the offering.

Awards

References

Advertising agencies of the United States
Digital marketing companies of the United States
Companies based in Atlanta
Marketing companies established in 1981
Online advertising services and affiliate networks
Privately held companies based in Georgia (U.S. state)